René Bansard (1904–1971) was a French archaeologist.

Background
He was born in 1904 to a merchant in Grandcamp-Maisy. He died in 1971 in Saint-André-de-Messei.

1904 births
1971 deaths
20th-century French non-fiction writers
20th-century French male writers
French archaeologists
French male non-fiction writers
20th-century archaeologists